Philippa "Pippa" Malmgren is an American technology entrepreneur and economist. She served as Special Assistant to the President of the United States, George W. Bush, for Economic Policy on the National Economic Council and is a former member of the U.S. President's Working Group on Financial Markets and The President's Working Group on Corporate Governance. She wrote the dissertation "Economic Statecraft: United States Antidumping and Countervailing Duty Policy" to obtain her PhD in International Relations from the London School of Economics in 1991 and was the Commencement Speaker at LSE in 2013 and 2016.

Ms. Malmgren is, "... a member of the Council on Foreign Relations, Chatham House, The Institute for International Strategic Security and the Royal Geographical Society."
She is a senior partner to The Monaco Foundry and Avonhurst and a Senior Associate Fellow of RUSI.

Dr. Malmgren is the author of Geopolitics for Investors, Signals: How Everyday Signs Help Us Navigate the World's Turbulent Economy, The Leadership Lab (winner of the 2019 Business Book of the Year Award) and The Infinite Leader (winner of the 2021 International Press Award for Best Book on Leadership). She has been credited with the first usage of the term "shrinkflation".

Her father is Harald Malmgren, who has served as a senior aide to US Presidents John F. Kennedy, Lyndon B. Johnson, Richard Nixon, and Gerald Ford.

Bibliography 
 Signals: How Everyday Signs Can Help Us Navigate the World's Turbulent Economy (2016) Weidenfeld & Nicolson 
 Geopolitics for Investors (2015) CFA Institute Research Foundation 
 Signals: The Breakdown of the Social Contract and the Rise of Geopolitics (2014) Grosvenor House Publishing Limited

References

External links 
 Official website
 Foreign Policy Association interview with Dr. Malmgren
 Monaco Foundry

1962 births
Living people
American women economists
21st-century American economists
Mount Vernon Seminary and College alumni
International finance economists
Macroeconomists
American economics writers
Alumni of the London School of Economics